Alex Metreveli defeated Kim Warwick, 6–3, 6–3, 7–6, to win the 1972 South Australian Tennis Championships singles event. The First Round was the best of 3 sets, while all other rounds were the best of 5 sets.

Draw

Main draw

References

External links
 Brisbane International on the Official Association of Tennis Professionals website

Singles